The 2006 Speedway World Cup Qualification (SWC) were two motorcycle speedway events used to determine the two national teams who qualify for the 2006 Speedway World Cup. According to the FIM rules the top six nations (Poland, Sweden, Denmark, Great Britain, Australia and Czech Republic) from the 2005 Speedway World Cup were automatically qualified.

Results

Heat details

Daugavpils (1) 
Qualifying round 1
 27 May 2005
  Daugavpils, Latvijas Spidveja Centrs
 Referee: ?

Miskolc (2) 
Qualifying round 2
 28 May 2005
  Miskolc
 Referee: ?

References

See also 
 2006 Speedway World Cup

Q